Shirley Ann Caesar-Williams (born October 13, 1938), known professionally as Shirley Caesar, is an American gospel singer. Her career began in 1951, when she signed to Federal Records at the age of 12. Throughout her seven decade career, Caesar has often been referred to as the "First Lady of Gospel Music", and "The Queen of Gospel Music". Additionally, she has won eleven Grammy Awards, fifteen Dove Awards, and fourteen Stellar Awards.

Caesar has released over forty albums. She has participated in over 16 compilations and three gospel musicals, Mama I Want to Sing, Sing: Mama 2 and Born to sing: Mama 3.

According to SoundScan, she has sold 2.2 million albums since 1991. She has made several notable appearances including the televised Live from Disney World Night of Joy, the Gospel According to VH1, and a White House performance for President George Bush. She gave a speech on the evolution of gospel music to the US Treasury Department. In 2017, Caesar was honored with a Grammy Lifetime Achievement Award from The Recording Academy. She has also received SESAC Lifetime Achievement Award, Rhapsody & Rhythm Award from the National Museum of African American Music, as well as induction into the Gospel Music Hall of Fame.

Early life 
Caesar was born in Durham, North Carolina. She is the tenth of 13 children. All of her siblings are now deceased. Her father Jim Caesar was a well known local gospel singer but he died suddenly when Shirley was seven years old. Her mother Hallie Caesar was semi-invalid due to a lame leg. Caesar had a special bond with her mother and took care of her until her death in 1986.

Career

Caesar first began singing and performing for family and friends. She began singing as Baby Shirley Caesar all over the Carolinas as invitations poured in. She could only perform on weekends due to being in school during the weekdays.  Her professional music career began in 1958 at 19, when she approached Albertina Walker about joining The Caravans, one of the most popular gospel groups at that time. Albertina wanted the vocally talented young Caesar in her group after hearing her sing a solo. Caesar decided to halt her education to join the group.

Caesar recorded and performed with Albertina Walker, Cassietta George, Inez Andrews, Delores Washington, Josephine Howard, Eddie Williams, and James Herndon while in the Caravans. Her biggest hit with the Caravans was the song "Sweeping Through the City" followed by "No Coward Soldier". After eight years with the Caravans, she decided to leave after being offered a solo recording contract with Hob Records. Her first LP on the Hob label was entitled  I'll Go, backed up by the Institutional Radio Choir and includes the classics "Oh Peter, Don't Be Afraid" and "Choose Ye This Day". Other hits soon followed with recordings such as "Satan, We're Gonna Tear Your Kingdom Down", "God's Not Dead, He's Yet Alive" and the classic "Don't Drive Your Mama Away". In 1971, she won her first Grammy Award for her recording of "Put Your Hand in the Hand of the Man", and in 1975 her recording of the song "No Charge" became an instant hit and her first gold record. Although she had success she wanted to reach larger audiences and felt this wasn't being achieved with Hob Records; she decided not to renew her record contract with them which ended that same year.

To reach more people with her music, Caesar signed with a secular record label called Roadshow Records in 1977 and released the debut album entitled First Lady. The producer of the album titled the album First Lady because Caesar was the first female to ever record on the label. The album contained songs with strong gospel lyrics, but many within the gospel community felt that the music itself was "too worldly," and many gospel DJs refused to play it on their radio station. One song, however, "Faded Rose", later became a Caesar classic. Overall, the album sold poorly, but the "First Lady" title caught on within the gospel industry, and concert announcers, DJs and gospel promoters everywhere started introducing her as "The First Lady of Gospel Music", a title that has been associated with her ever since. The second and final album she recorded for Roadshow was From the Heart in 1978; it was poorly received for the same reason. Caesar searched for a gospel label and finally decided to sign with Word Records in 1980 and went on to win several more Grammy Awards during the next several years and beyond. She stayed with Word for many years and recorded some of the biggest hits of her career such as "God's Got It All in Control", "Hold My Mule" (which later went viral as a Thanksgiving-related Internet meme under the title "You Name It"), "He's Working It Out for You", "Jesus, I Love Calling Your Name" and "You're Next in Line for a Miracle".

She has made a name for herself on the gospel music circuit, making guest appearances on the Bobby Jones gospel show and other popular television shows. Caesar credits Albertina Walker as her mentor and "Queen of Gospel Music".

Between 1981 and 1995, she received seven Dove Awards for Black Gospel Album of the Year for Live at the G.M.W.A., Celebration, Christmasing, Sailin‘, Live ... In Chicago, Go and Rejoice. She received two Black Gospel Song of the Year Awards for "He's Working It Out for You" and "Hold My Mule". She has performed with such performers as Patti LaBelle, Whitney Houston, Dorothy Norwood, Faith Evans, Dottie Peoples, Arnold Houston, Kim Burrell, John P. Kee, Kirk Franklin, Tonex, and Tye Tribbett among others. Caesar is also an actress. She acted in movies, such as Why Do Fools Fall in Love (1998) with Larenz Tate and Little Richard, Fighting Temptations (2003) with Beyoncé and Cuba Gooding Jr., and The Unseen (2005) with Steve Harris. She also acted in an episode of The Good News in 1998 as Aunt Shirley. Caesar appeared on The Parkers in 2004.

In 2014, her song "Teach Me Master", which originally appeared on her 1972 album Get Up My Brother was sampled by Dutch producer Bakermat as "Teach Me"; it reached number 22 on the UK Singles Chart. In 2016, she found herself back at the very top of the gospel Billboard chart with her newest CD release Fill This House.

Awards and honors
Caesar is a recipient of a 1999 National Heritage Fellowship from the National Endowment for the Arts, which is the United States' highest honor in the folk and traditional arts.

She was inducted into the Gospel Music Hall of Fame in 2000.

Caesar was inducted into the North Carolina Music Hall of Fame in 2010. She performed for President Barack Obama and Michelle Obama at the White House in 2015, along with Aretha Franklin.

In May 2016, the National Museum of African American Music honored Caesar with the Rhapsody & Rhythm Award in Nashville in advance of the planned 2018 opening of the historic museum.

The Hollywood Chamber of Commerce proudly honored gospel singer Shirley Caesar with the 2,583rd star on the Hollywood Walk of Fame on Tuesday, June 28, 2016.

Education in later life
After many years, Caesar finally accomplished her dream of completing her education. She returned to school and graduated with honors from Shaw University with a Bachelor of Science degree in Business Administration in 1984. She also spent time studying at the Divinity School of Duke University and has received honorary doctorates from Shaw University and Southeastern University.

Personal life
Caesar married Bishop Harold I. Williams in June 1983.  The couple were co-pastors of the 1,500-member Mount Calvary Word of Faith Church in Raleigh, North Carolina until his death on July 4, 2014. While she does not have children of her own, she has two stepchildren from her husband. 

Caesar is a member of Delta Sigma Theta sorority. She cites her mother as a strong influence in her decision to give so selflessly of herself. Caesar has committed a sizable portion of all concert sales to her outreach ministries. Recently she has cut back on preaching and has appointed an executive pastor at her church and he provides weekly sermons to the congregation while Caesar serves as senior pastor but Caesar continues to record and perform in concert all over the country. She also continues to hold her annual outreach ministries conference. The outreach ministry provides food, clothing, shelter, toys for children, and financial assistance to those in need. She opened an eponymous store and uses the profits to help others during the holiday season. 

When asked what would she still like to accomplish, she says: "I would like to do more acting...."

Discography

Albums

Charting singles

As lead artist

Guest appearances

References

1938 births
20th-century African-American women singers
20th-century Christians
21st-century African-American women
21st-century American women singers
21st-century American singers
21st-century Christians
African-American Christians
American evangelists
American gospel singers
American mezzo-sopranos
American Pentecostals
Delta Sigma Theta members
Grammy Lifetime Achievement Award winners
Living people
Musicians from Durham, North Carolina
National Heritage Fellowship winners
Shaw University alumni
Women evangelists